A by-election was held in the state electoral district of Cootamundra on 14 October 2017. The by-election was triggered by the resignation of Katrina Hodgkinson. The by-election was won by Steph Cooke for the National Party on preferences. The Nationals suffered a 20% swing on first preference votes and 10% on a two-party basis.

The by-election was held on the same day as by-elections in Blacktown and Murray.

Candidates
The candidates in ballot paper order are as follows:

Results

Katrina Hodgkinson resigned.

See also
Electoral results for the district of Cootamundra
List of New South Wales state by-elections

References

External links
New South Wales Electoral Commission: Cootamundra State By-election
ABC Elections: Cootamundra by-election

2017 elections in Australia
New South Wales state by-elections